Brush Creek is an unincorporated community and census-designated place (CDP) in Delaware County, Oklahoma, United States. The population was 35 at the 2010 census.

Geography
Brush Creek is located near the center of Delaware County at  (36.420011, -94.787827). It is bordered on the northwest by the city of Jay, the county seat, on the north by Oklahoma State Highway 20, and on the south by Brush Creek, a southwest-flowing tributary of Spavinaw Creek and part of the Neosho River watershed.

Demographics

As of the census of 2000, there were 41 people, 13 households, and 9 families residing in the community. The population density was 50.1 people per square mile (19.3/km2). There were 13 housing units at an average density of 15.9/sq mi (6.1/km2). The racial makeup of the community was 31.71% White, 46.34% Native American, 2.44% from other races, and 19.51% from two or more races. Hispanic or Latino of any race were 2.44% of the population.

There were 13 households, out of which 38.5% had children under the age of 18 living with them, 53.8% were married couples living together, 7.7% had a female householder with no husband present, and 23.1% were non-families. 23.1% of all households were made up of individuals, and 15.4% had someone living alone who was 65 years of age or older. The average household size was 3.15 and the average family size was 3.70.

In the community, the population age range was spread out, with 29.3% under the age of 18, 14.6% from 18 to 24, 29.3% from 25 to 44, 12.2% from 45 to 64, and 14.6% who were 65 years of age or older. The median age was 30 years. For every 100 females, there were 105.0 males. For every 100 females age 18 and over, there were 93.3 males.

The median income for a household in the community was $20,625, and the median income for a family was $19,375. Males had a median income of $23,750 versus $0 for females. The per capita income for the community was $10,288. There were no families and 7.7% of the population living below the poverty line, including no under eighteens and none of those over 64.

References

Census-designated places in Oklahoma
Census-designated places in Delaware County, Oklahoma